Brandon Tynan (born James William Tynan; April 11, 1875 – March 19, 1967) was an Irish-born American stage and screen actor. In his early stage career he appeared with Alla Nazimova on Broadway in her early years after migrating from Russia. He may have been briefly romantically involved with her. He was married to Caroline Whyte, a daughter of Isadore Rush, who died in 1918 and later to actress Lily Cahill.

Born in Dublin, Tynan appeared in films beginning in 1923 in silents. His last film appearance was in 1941. During his tenure in films he continued to appear in plays until 1936.

Tynan acted on stage in a production of the Ziegfeld Follies, impersonating David Belasco. He also wrote seven plays that were produced. His Broadway debut came in El Gran Galeoto (1899), and he concluded his Broadway work with Three Wise Fools (1936).

Tynan died at the Lynwood Nursing Home in New York on March 19, 1967, aged 91.

Filmography

References

External links

1875 births
1967 deaths
Male actors from Dublin (city)
Irish male film actors
Irish male stage actors
Irish emigrants to the United States (before 1923)